Gartok is made of twin encampment settlements of Gar Günsa and Gar Yarsa (Wade–Giles: Ka-erh-ya-sha) in the Gar County in the Ngari Prefecture of Tibet. Gar Gunsa served as the winter encampment and Gar Yarsa as the summer encampment. But in British nomenclature, the name Gartok was applied only to Gar Yarsa and the practice continues to date.

Gartok was established as Lhasa's administrative headquarters for Western Tibet (Ngari) after it conquered it from Ladakh in 1684. A senior official called Garpön was stationed here. Gartok (Gar Yarsa) also served as Western Tibet's principal trade-market. But the village itself was small and is said to have been quite poor. After the Chinese annexation of Tibet, the headquarters of Western Tibet was moved to Shiquanhe.

Name 

Gar means "encampment". During the 15th and 16th centuries, the Karma Kagyu lamas moved through the length and breadth of Tibet in "Great Encampments" or garchen.
The term is also often used for military camps.

British sources interpreted "Gar Yarsa" as the "summer camp".
However, the ninth century bilingual text Mahāvyutpatti translated yarsa as Sanskrit , literally, the residence of the rainy season.
Even though Gar Yarsa has acquired the name "Gartok" in popular parlance, officially, "Gartok" consists of both Gar Yarsa and Gar Gunsa (the "winter camp"). The latter is forty miles downstream on Gartang at a lower altitude.

The Lhasan administrators of Western Tibet based at Gartok were called Garpöns.
They lived in Gar Gunsa for nine months of the year, and stayed at Gar Yarsa August–October.

Description 
Gar Yarsa lies on the road between Ladakh and Shigatse, northeast of the present day Indian state of Himachal Pradesh, with all of which it has had trade relations. William Moorcroft regarded the Gar Valley as part of Changtang, whose main occupation was the production of pashmina wool.

By all accounts, Gar Yarsa appears to have been a small village. Moorcroft wrote that it was little more than an encampment, with a number of blanket tents and a few houses built of sun-dried bricks. Ladakhi envoy Abdul Wahid Radhu stated that nomad tents outnumbered solid houses. British explorer Cecil Rawling stated that Gartok had only "three good sized houses and twelve miserable hovels".
The Garpons resided there for three months a year, during which Gartok became a busy centre of commerce. No less than 500 nomads and merchants would congregate there at any given time.

The village also has a small temple referred to as "Gar Yarsa gompa".

History

Tibet–Ladakh-Mughal War 
The rise of Gartok as the seat of Lhasa's authority in western Tibet  occurred after the Tibet–Ladakh–Mughal War (1681–1684). Prior to this, the Gar Valley was part of Guge, which was either independent or under the control of Ladakh. In 1630, Ladakh had annexed the entire kingdom of Guge, including the Gar Valley. Through the war, Central Tibet, based in Lhasa, challenged Ladakh's supremacy.

During the war, the large army of Galdan Chhewang, Tibet's general, is said to have encamped in the Gar Valley. The first clash with Ladakhi forces took place near the confluence of the Gartang and Sengge Zangbo, with the locations Langmar and Rala mentioned in the sources.

After the end of the war, Galdan Chhewang organised the administration of the new province Ngari, and appointed Lozang Péma as governor (gzim dpon) before returning to Lhasa. The Tibetan government appointed prefects (rdzoṅ sdod) to the traditional districts of Purang, Tsaparang and Tashigang. But eventually Tashigang lost its importance, and Gartok took its place. Lhasa-appointed governors for the whole of Ngari, called Garpons, took their seat at Gartok.

Commercially, Gartok had the advantage of being equidistant between the Changthang, whose shepherds brought pashmina wool for sale, and their buyers in Ladakh and Bashahr.

19th century 
William Moorcroft was the first British official to set foot in western Tibet. He arrived in Daba in 1812, along with another adventurer Hearshey, disguised as an Indian gosain merchant. He was hoping to find Central Asian horses for East India Company's stud as well as any other profitable merchandise such as the pashmina wool. The officials in Daba sent him on to Gartok. The Garpon received them civilly and agreed to sell the goods they wanted. He was later punished by Lhasa with three years imprisonment, for permitting foreigners into the country.

The prohibition against foreigners did not apply to customary traders from Indian borderlands. However the sale of pashmina wool was limited to Ladakhis, as per the Treaty of Tingmosgang of 1684. Some wool did make it to Bashahr, which was an ally of Tibet during the Tibet–Ladakh–Mughal War, as well as Zanskar (along with its territories of Lahul and Spiti), which was part of the family of west Tibetan kingdoms. The British tried to exploit these connections later for acquiring pashmina wool.

In 1817, after the Anglo-Nepalese War, W. J. Webb, the East Indian Company's surveyor of Kumaon and Garhwal, also made efforts to enter Tibet for the purpose of surveying. He earned the trust of the Tibetan officials and was permitted limited entry, beyond which the officials said permission would be needed from Lhasa and Peking.

20th century 
In accordance with the Treaty of Lhasa in 1904, Gartok, together with Yatung and Gyantse, was thrown open to British trade. On the return of the column from Lhasa in that year, Gartok was visited by a party under Captain C. H. D. Ryder, who found only a few dozen people in winter quarters, their houses being in the midst of a bare plain. In summer, however, all the trade between Tibet and Ladakh passed through it.

Notes

References

Bibliography 
 
 
 
 
 
 
 

Populated places in Ngari Prefecture